"Jody's Got Your Girl and Gone" is a 1970 R&B single by Johnnie Taylor.  The song was written by record producer Don Davis with Kent Barker and Cam Wilson, and produced by Davis. The single was Taylor's second number one on the U.S. R&B chart and crossed over to the Billboard Hot 100, peaking at number twenty-eight in February 1971.

Chart positions

See also
List of number-one rhythm and blues singles of 1971 (U.S.)

References

1971 singles
Johnnie Taylor songs
1970 songs
Songs written by Don Davis (record producer)
Song recordings produced by Don Davis (record producer)
Stax Records singles